Muldamine is a phytosterol alkaloid isolated from Veratrum californicum. It is the acetate ester of the piperidine steroid teinemine.

See also 
 Veratrum
 Veratridine

References 

Steroidal alkaloids
Piperidines
Phytosterols
Acetate esters